Old Cann Mansion House is a historic home located at Kirkwood, New Castle County, Delaware.  It was built about 1792, and consists of three sections. The main section is a -story, five-bay double-pile brick structure.  Attached to it is a lower -story, single-pile wing. In the rear is a two-story, frame addition built in the late 19th century. The house is in the Georgian style. Also on the property are a contributing frame board-and-batten barn and privy, and three frame sheds.

It was added to the National Register of Historic Places in 1982.

References

Houses on the National Register of Historic Places in Delaware
Georgian architecture in Delaware
Houses completed in 1798
Houses in New Castle County, Delaware
National Register of Historic Places in New Castle County, Delaware